Dollfus is French surname, originally from the Alsace region. It may refer to:

Adrien Dollfus (1858–1921), French carcinologist
Audouin Dollfus (1924–2010), French astronomer and aeronaut
Gustave Frédéric Dollfus (1850–1931), French geologist and malacologist
Jean Dollfus (1800–1887), French industrialist 
Maurice Dollfus (1885–?), French businessman, executive for Ford Motor Company of France
Olivier Dollfus (1931–2005), French geographer
Robert-Philippe Dollfus (1887–1976), French zoologist and parasitologist

See also
2451 Dollfus, a main-belt asteroid, named for Audouin Dollfus
Dollfus' stargazer (Uranoscopus dollfusi), a poisonous salt-water fish
Dollfus-Mieg et Compagnie, a French textile company founded by the Dollfus family
Engelbert Dollfuss (1892-1934), Austrian politician